Samuel Firmino de Jesus (born 7 April 1986), known as Samuel is a Brazilian professional footballer who plays as a centre-back for Taubaté.

Biography
Samuel started his career with Ituano, which he was registered as an amateur in 2005 season. He made his Série B debut on 23 April 2005 and scored a goal on 23 August. He also played the last round of the season as last minute substitute, on 10 September, which the team did not advance to the second stage (quarter-final). He signed a professional three-year contract on 28 July 2006.

In January 2007, he was signed by Portuguesa on a one-year deal, where he met his namesake forward Samuel. In the 2008 season, at first he left for Comercial de Ribeirão Preto, then União São João (on 1 July) and Paraná (on 5 August). He scored the opening goal on 23 January 2008, losing to Santo André 2–1, and played every games in 2008 Campeonato Paulista Série A2.

In the 2009 season, he was signed by Joinville. He signed a new 1-year deal in April, winning 2009 Copa Santa Catarina and 2009 Recopa Sul-Brasileira; finished as the runner-up of 2010 Campeonato Catarinense.

His contract with Joinville expired on 10 May 2010 and was not renewed. On 17 June 2010, he was signed by São Paulo FC until the end of season.

On 31 January 2011, he was signed by Werder Bremen as free agent.

Honours
 Campeonato Paulista Série A2: 2007
 Copa Santa Catarina: 2009

Career statistics

References

External links
 

1986 births
Living people
Association football central defenders
Brazilian footballers
Campeonato Brasileiro Série A players
Campeonato Brasileiro Série B players
Campeonato Brasileiro Série C players
Belgian Pro League players
K League 2 players
Ituano FC players
Associação Portuguesa de Desportos players
Comercial Futebol Clube (Ribeirão Preto) players
União São João Esporte Clube players
Paraná Clube players
Joinville Esporte Clube players
São Paulo FC players
SV Werder Bremen players
R.S.C. Anderlecht players
S.C. Braga players
São Bernardo Futebol Clube players
Agremiação Sportiva Arapiraquense players
ABC Futebol Clube players
Red Bull Brasil players
Atlético Clube Goianiense players
Busan IPark players
Clube Atlético Linense players
Clube Atlético Bragantino players
Esporte Clube Juventude players
Brazilian expatriate footballers
Brazilian expatriate sportspeople in Germany
Expatriate footballers in Germany
Brazilian expatriate sportspeople in Belgium
Expatriate footballers in Belgium
Brazilian expatriate sportspeople in Portugal
Expatriate footballers in Portugal
Footballers from São Paulo